Lost Trail Powder Mountain is an alpine ski area in the western United States, on the Montana-Idaho border in the northern Rocky Mountains. In  the Bitterroot Range, it is at the junction of US Highway 93 and Montana State Highway 43 at Lost Trail Pass, about one mile (1.6 km) northwest of Chief Joseph Pass, which is on the Continental Divide.

Chairlift #1 runs approximately along the Idaho-Montana border; the terrain to its south, including Chairlift #2, is in Idaho.

When chairlift #3 (Huckleberry) was added on the Montana side in 2002, it lowered the base by 200 vertical feet (60 m). The slopes on the mountain are primarily east-facing.

The ski area is located immediately west of US-93, which descends northward into Montana.

The ski area is open four days per week (Thursday through Sunday) and holidays. The business office is to the north in Montana at Conner, about midway to Hamilton.

Terrain

The mountain is open to both skiers and snowboarders. Terrain ranges from rails, tables, and wallrides to powder pillows and cliff lines.

Plane crash
In 2014, a vintage World War II-era aircraft lost control in a late spring snow squall on June 17 and crashed into the ski area's main parking lot. The Grumman G-21A Goose caught fire and was completely destroyed; its only occupant, the pilot, was killed. The day lodge had hosted a conference that Tuesday which concluded shortly before the late afternoon incident. The Minnesota pilot, age 62, was ferrying the twin-engine amphibious plane, originally from Florida, to Hamilton and had made earlier stops that day in Dillon and Salmon, Idaho.

Video
You Tube – Lost Trail Powder Mountain – 2010

References

External links
 

 Visit MT.com official state tourism site - Lost Trail Powder Mountain
 Montana Ski Resorts.com - Lost Trail Powder Mountain
 Ski Map.org – trail maps – Lost Trail Powder Mountain
 Idaho Transportation Dept. - webcam - Lost Trail Pass - US-93
 EPA.gov - environmental impact for expansion - 25-July-1996
 Opening of Chair #4 - Feb-2003

Ski areas and resorts in Montana
Ski areas and resorts in Idaho
Buildings and structures in Ravalli County, Montana
Buildings and structures in Lemhi County, Idaho
Tourist attractions in Ravalli County, Montana
Tourist attractions in Lemhi County, Idaho